is a JR West San'in Main Line railway station located in Hōhoku, Shimonoseki, Yamaguchi Prefecture, Japan. It is one of the stations on the Misuzu Shiosai Experience, which takes place on certain trains during the day between Nagatoshi and Hatabu.

Station Layout
The station has two platforms, serving two tracks, enabling passengers to change train via a footbridge. The station building has retained its traditional wooden structure for many years.  The station is run by the Nagato Railroad Bureau. Agawa Station is a Kan'i itaku station. Though there are no staff members, standard tickets can be purchased from a small shop a short distance from the station.

History
 9 September 1928 - The extension of the Japanese National Rail Kogushi Line, as it was then known, from Takibe Station, is completed. Agawa Station became the new final stop and began servicing customer as well as freight trains.
 7 December 1930 - The extension of the Mine Line, as it was then known, from Nagato-Furuichi Station is completed. Agawa Station becomes the border point between the Mine Line and the Kogushi Line.
 24 February 1933 - The Kogushi Line and Mine Line are incorporated into the San'in Main Line.
 1 June 1963 -  The service of freight trains is cancelled.
 1 April 1987 - Under the privatisation of Japan's railways, Agawa Station becomes part of the West Japan Railway Company.

Platforms

Lines
The following lines pass through or terminate at Agawa Station:
West Japan Railway Company
San'in Main Line

Local Area
 Agawa Beach
 The Agawamōri Family Graveyard
 Agawa Post Office
 Japan National Route 191
 Okitagawa

User Statistics
Below are the average number of people who alight at Takibe Station per day.
 1999 - 195
 2000 - 176
 2001 - 183
 2002 - 143
 2003 - 146
 2004 - 142
 2005 - 131
 2006 - 143
 2007 - 142
 2008 - 130
 2009 - 117
 2010 - 93
 2011 - 91

References

External links
Agawa Station (JR West) 

Railway stations in Japan opened in 1928
Railway stations in Yamaguchi Prefecture
Sanin Main Line
Stations of West Japan Railway Company